Durham University Electric Motorsport (DUEM) is a student-run team in the United Kingdom that designs and constructs solar powered cars to compete in international competitions. DUEM is the longest running solar car team in the UK and is financed entirely by third party donations and sponsorship.

Background

Durham University Electric Motorsport is based in the university’s School of Engineering, with a team size of around 50 undergraduate students split broadly across mechanical, electrical, electronic and business sub-teams. The team is also strongly supported by graduates and academics within the department with expertise in the fields of solar technology, racing car aerodynamics, direct-drive electrical machines and electrical/hybrid vehicles. Some concepts and features implemented in the vehicles have been developed as part of final year undergraduate projects.

The team was founded as Durham University Solar Car (DUSC) in 2002, and it built its first vehicle in 2004. DUSC’s first competitive event was the 2008 North American Solar Challenge in which they finished 14th out of 26 competitors, earning the “Best Rookie Team” award. They were the only British team to compete. DUSC also competed in the 2011 Veolia World Solar Challenge race across Australia, qualifying in the top ten & then finishing 33rd out of 42 entrants. 

In 2014 Durham University Solar Car combined with Durham University Formula Student to create Durham University Electric Motorsport (DUEM). DUEM developed a new solar powered vehicle called DUSC 2015, paying homage to the design work carried out while the team was still known as DUSC - DUSC 2015 competed in the 2015 Bridgestone World Solar Challenge.

In 2017, the team headed back to Australia to compete once more with a modified version of DUSC 2015, showing an improvement in performance and completing more than 1000 km on solar power.

DUEM also participates in local community and awareness outreach events, including touring schools and museum exhibitions to promote science, technology and engineering. In 2010, DUEM (then DUSC) ran a successful demonstration event with Cambridge University Eco Racing (CUER).

DUSC 2011

Specifications

Mechanical design

The steel space frame chassis was designed using finite element analysis software. The chassis is strong enough to withstand a heavy impact, whilst also being as light as possible. The suspension consists of racing shock absorbers, with a conventional double wishbone arrangement at the front and a trailing arm at the rear. Special brake calipers are used, which retract to ensure there are no frictional losses when the brakes are not applied. Specialist solar car tyres are employed to reduce rolling resistance.

Electrical design

A combination of high-efficiency silicon solar cells and maximum power point trackers are used to extract the maximum possible power from the available solar energy and feed it into a lithium iron phosphate battery pack. The vehicle is driven by a specially designed axial flux wheel motor via a custom controller, resulting in higher efficiency and less transmission loss than conventional electric motors.

Electronic design

The vehicle makes use of a telemetry system operating the CAN protocol to communicate real-time vehicle data over a radio link to a support vehicle. Using this data, the driver may make control adjustments to the vehicle to account for the current performance of the electrical package.

Racing as DUSC2008

Substantially the same car was raced both as DUSC2008 across North America and as DUSC2011 across Australia. The major changes between the two are that in 2008 a chain drive was used instead of the in wheel motor, lead acid batteries were used instead of lithium iron, and a commercial solar array was used instead of in-house custom encapsulated panels. There were also numerous other minor changes.

DUSC 2015

Specifications

Mechanical design

DUSC 2015 is a Challenger Class solar car designed to compete in the 2015 Bridgestone World Solar Challenge. It is the first vehicle built by DUEM to feature a carbon fibre monocoque, offering significant weight savings over earlier spaceframe designs. Extensive finite element analysis was performed on the chassis to optimise its design and crash safety. The car uses a 4-wheeled catamaran configuration, designed to have minimal frontal area to reduce drag.

The car's front suspension is a duolever design, chosen for its favourable packaging requirements. Carbon trailing arm rear suspension is used to reduce unsprung mass. Industrial hydraulic retracting brake calipers are used to minimise mechanical power losses. DUSC 2015 runs on specialist Schwalbe Energiser S tyres, featuring a solar car specific low rolling resistance compound.

Electrical design

DUSC 2015 has a 6 m2 solar array, using high-efficiency cells from Gochermann Solar Technology. The array is capable of providing 1.4 kW at peak sunlight, which can drive the motor directly or feed excess power into the lithium iron phosphate battery pack.

The car uses a bespoke in-hub brushless motor designed and manufactured in Durham University. The axial flux machine is a derivative of a concept first designed in 2011, optimised to give a peak efficiency of 98%, and develops a maximum power of 5 kW. The machine drives the rear left wheel of the vehicle only, which is made possible by the vehicle's asymmetric weight distribution.

Electronic design

To capture as much telemetry data as possible, custom circuitry termed 'sensor nodes' were developed. Sensor nodes are designed so they can all communicate to each other across the length of the vehicle, as well as each individual node being able to interface with over 20 different sensors each. This also allows some data to be relayed to the driver via the dashboard.

DUSC (2017)

Specifications

Mechanical design

The 2017 car from DUEM, simply called 'DUSC', is a heavily modified version of DUSC 2015. While several aspects (such as the monocoque, powertrain, and wheels) remained unchanged from the 2015 car, changes were made both to improve performance and comply with new regulations introduced for Challenger-class vehicles in the 2017 Bridgestone World Solar Challenge.

To improve handling characteristics and stability, the car uses a new version of the duolever front suspension. While this contributes an overall increase in weight, other changes such as optimizing the trailing arm shape mitigate the effects. To reduce drag, wheel covers are used on the existing rims.

Electrical design

In line with 2017 regulations, the solar array area of DUSC is 4 m2 (down from 6 m2) using the same cells as DUSC 2015. This feeds the motor (largely unchanged from the previous iteration), as well as a new lithium-ion battery, which represents a significant weight saving.

Electronics design

The car uses a new driver dashboard, allowing the driver to obtain real-time telemetry information directly as well as improving layout and ergonomics. Changes were also made to the exterior lights to comply with regulations, increasing indicator and brakelight visibility.

Ortus (2019)

DUEM's new solar car for 2019, named "Ortus," was designed and built from scratch for the Bridgestone World Solar Challenge 2019.

Specifications

Competitions

Sponsors
Financially DUEM relies solely on sponsorship. The team's current sponsors are:
 Durham University
 GREEN AXXE
 Climb Online
 Evonik Industries
 Sevcon
 iMechE
 Kensington Capital
 GH Cityprint
 DJI
 Labman
 Fobo
 The Royal Navy
 Sigmatex
 Tufnol Composites
 Robert Cupitt
 Gochermann
 Altair HyperWorks
 Eurocircuits
 Designs Unique

Former sponsors include:
 Institution of Engineering and Technology
 Gurit
 Deloitte
 Durham University Engineering Society
 Energy Institute
 RS Components
 C&D Technologies
 EPSRC
 Jaguar Land Rover.

See also
Durham University School of Engineering
World Solar Challenge
North American Solar Challenge
List of solar car teams

References

External links
Durham University Solar Car
Durham University School of Engineering
World Solar Challenge
North American Solar Challenge
Harnessing the sun in 1,800-mile race across Australia from The Northern Echo, Saturday 28 April 2007
Ray of hope in solar challenge from The Journal, Thursday 3 May 2007
Light Speed Ahead from the Doncaster Free Press, Thursday 10 May 2007

Solar Car
Engineering education in the United Kingdom
Solar car racing